Henvelik is a genus of ground beetles in the family Carabidae. There are at least two described species in Henvelik.

Species
These two species belong to the genus Henvelik:
 Henvelik kalchhigenn Morvan, 1999  (Nepal)
 Henvelik kucerai Morvan, 2004  (India)

References

Platyninae
Monotypic Carabidae genera